"Dreams (Will Come Alive)" is a song by Dutch Eurodance group 2 Brothers on the 4th Floor featuring D-Rock and Des'Ray. It was released in June 1994 as the fourth single from their debut album, Dreams (1994), and is their most commercially successful single. It peaked at number-one in the Netherlands, and was also used in the Dutch movies Flodder 3 and New Kids Nitro and in the Italian film Happy as Lazzaro.

In 2009, the song was remixed and released by Italian DJ Gabry Ponte and Format-C.

Chart performance
"Dreams (Will Come Alive)" was a major hit in several countries and remains the group's most successful single to date, peaking at number-one in the Netherlands. In Europe, it reached the top 10 also in Italy (number four), Finland and Belgium. Additionally, it was a top 20 hit in Denmark, Iceland and Sweden, and a top 30 hit in Germany, as well as on the Eurochart Hot 100, where it reached number 25 in October 1994. As the only single by the group to chart in the UK, it peaked at number 93 in its first and only week at the UK Singles Chart, on July 9, 1994. Outside Europe, "Dreams" was a huge hit in Israel, peaking at number two, while in Australia, it only reached number 185.

Critical reception
James Hamilton from British magazine Music Weeks RM Dance Update described the song as a "old fashioned rave style squawking shrill girl wailed and at times inevitable gruff gruff rapped Euro hit".

Music video
A music video was produced to promote the single and was directed by Czar. The video was later published on YouTube in March 2013. As of August 2020, it has amassed more than 46 million views.

Track listings

 CD maxi-single (Europe, 1994) "Dreams (Will Come Alive)" (Radio Version) - 4:22
 "Dreams (Will Come Alive)" (Twenty 4 Seven Trance Mix) - 5:48
 "Dreams (Will Come Alive)" (Lick Mix) - 4:16
 "Dreams (Will Come Alive)" (D.J. Paradize Underground Mmix) - 4:07
 "Dreams (Will Come Alive)" (Extended Version) - 5:05
 "Dreams (Will Come Alive)" (Twenty 4 Seven Trance Dub) - 4:10

 Gabry Ponte Vs. Format-C - Digital EP (Europe, 2009)'
 "Dreams" (Video Edit)
 "Dreams" (Extended Mix)
 "Dreams" (UK Radio Edit)
 "Dreams" (UK Extended Mix)
 "Dreams" (Format-C Remix)
 "Dreams" (Paki & Jaro Remix)

Charts

Weekly charts

Year-end charts

References

1994 singles
1994 songs
2 Brothers on the 4th Floor songs
English-language Dutch songs
Music videos directed by Czar (director)